G. Sakunthala (born 19 August 1932) was an Indian actress who worked predominantly in Tamil films and plays. As she was a prominent member of MGR's drama troupe, Sakuntha appeared as a 'regular' cast member in many of MGR's movies, beginning from Manthiri Kumari,  Thaaikkuppin Thaaram and Mannadhi Mannan. Thus, she maintained her standing as one of the leading actresses in Tamil film industry in the 50's and early 60's. She has acted more 150 films in the Tamil cinema industry.

Early life 
Sakunthala was born in 1932 into an Isai Vellalar family in Chidambaram Thanjavur District. Sakunthala's native is Chidambaram. She has acted in dramas with M.G.R, Sivaji Ganesan, R. S. Manohar and S. S Rajendran.

Film career 
Sakunthala entered the film industry with MGR as the heroine in Manthiri Kumari. Though she has acted in Kalpana, a Hindi film, Manthiri Kumari (1950) was her debut into Tamil cinema. After Manthiri Kumari, S. S. Rajendran paired opposite The two heroines in the movie 'Chinna Durai' starring T. R Mahalingam in dual roles. M. Karunanidhi is the author of both films After these films, Sakuntala did not get a chance to play the heroine. Her chances of being a comedian, supporting character, dancing in a few films were all there. She has acted  almost 150 films in the Tamil cinema industry. Her last movie was Idhaya Veenai with MGR. After that she spent 20 years without acting in films.

Awards 
She got Kalaimamani Award recognized by the Government of Tamil Nadu in 1963.

Death 
She died on 8 November 2004 at the age of 72.

Filmography 
This is a partial filmography. You can expand it.

1950s

1960s

1970s

References 

Indian film actresses
1932 births
Actresses in Tamil cinema
20th-century Indian actresses
2004 deaths